Laura L. Koenig is an American linguist and speech scientist.

She is a professor of communication sciences and disorders at Adelphi University. She conducted her thesis work at Haskins Laboratories, and continues there as a Senior Scientist working on differences in laryngeal function across normal populations (men, women, and children) and on the development of speech production in children. Web of Science reports 20 papers in peer-reviewed journals, with over 200 citations. Much of her current work is conducted in collaboration with Jorge C. Lucero of the University of Brasilia. She teaches courses in phonetics, linguistics, acoustics, speech science, and research design, and is an Associate Editor for speech production of the Journal of the Acoustical Society of America.

Representative publications

Memberships
Acoustical Society of America (ASA), American Association for the Advancement of Science (AAAS), Linguistic Society of America (LSA), New York State Speech-Language-Hearing Association (NYSSHLA)

References

Linguists from the United States
Women linguists
Long Island University faculty
Haskins Laboratories scientists
Speech production researchers
Year of birth missing (living people)
Living people